Nine Holes is a two-player abstract strategy game from different parts of the world and is centuries old.  It was very popular in England.  It is related to tic-tac-toe, but even more related to three men's morris, Achi, Tant Fant, Shisima, Picaria, and Dara, because pieces are moved on the board to create the 3 in-a-row.  It is an alignment game.

Goal 

To create a 3 in-a-row of one's pieces either horizontally or vertically.  Diagonals do not count.

Equipment 

A 3 x 3 peg board is preferable.  Each player has 3 pieces.  One plays the black pieces, and the other plays the white pieces, however, any two colors or distinguishable objects will suffice.

The board is easily drawn on the ground or paper.

Rules and gameplay 

The board is empty in the beginning. Players decide what colors to play, and who will start first.  The game is then played through two stages:

Drop phase Each player drops one piece per turn on any vacant space on the board.  Players alternate their turns.  Pieces cannot move until all three pieces have been dropped.
Move phase After each player's three pieces have been dropped on the board, each player can move a piece to any vacant space on the board.  Only one piece can be moved per turn.

Players can create the 3 in-a-row at either the drop phase or move phase, and win the game.

Analysis 

Analysis has shown that the game is a draw with perfect play.

External links 
 http://healthy.uwaterloo.ca/museum/VirtualExhibits/rowgames/nineholes.html
 Play online https://parlor-games.azurewebsites.net/game/ternilapilli/

Abstract strategy games
Traditional board games